Isle of Wight is an island in Worcester County, Maryland. The island is in Isle of Wight Bay at the mouth of St. Martin River just west of Ocean City on Fenwick Island in eastern Maryland. The Ocean City Expressway crosses the island between the mainland and Fenwick Island.

The island is designated by the state of Maryland as a Wildlife Management Area.

References

External links 
Isle of Wight WMA

Landforms of Worcester County, Maryland
Uninhabited islands of Maryland